Orna Banai (born November 25, 1966) is an Israeli actress, comedian, entertainer and past member of the Tel Aviv-Yafo city Council.

Biography
Banai was born in Beersheba and raised in Omer. Her father was a judge in Beersheba, and her mother was an education executive for the City of Beersheba. Many of her relatives are successful Israeli actors and singers. The next generation of the Banai family, including Orna and her brothers, Meir and Eviatar, followed this tradition. After three years of studying acting in Nissan Nativ's studio in Tel Aviv, Banai started performing in stand-up comedy and entertainment shows.

Banai became known for her portraying "Limor" in the humorous Israeli television shows Action and Rak BeIsrael (with Erez Tal). Since 2003, Banai has appeared in the popular satirical television show Eretz Nehederet. In addition, Banai acted in television dramas like Merchav-Yarkon and Max VeMoris. Banai also appeared in theatrical plays like Singles and The Last Striptease.

She served as a member of the Tel Aviv-Yafo City Council on behalf of the Green Party from 2003 to 2008.

In 2005, Banai played "Efrat" in the television show Ima'lle, to which she contributed writing. The show was based on the story of Banai's own pregnancy and the birth of her son Amir.

Banai is a lesbian. She describes her views on the Arab–Israeli conflict as left-wing.

References

External links

1966 births
Living people
21st-century Israeli women politicians
Actresses from Tel Aviv
Orna
City councillors of Tel Aviv-Yafo
Israeli female comedians
Jewish Israeli actresses
Israeli people of Iranian-Jewish descent
Israeli stage actresses
Israeli television actresses
Jewish Israeli politicians
20th-century Israeli comedians
21st-century Israeli comedians
Lesbian politicians
Lesbian comedians
Israeli lesbian actresses
Israeli LGBT comedians
Israeli LGBT politicians
People from Omer, Israel
Mass media people from Beersheba